South Asia Economic Journal is a blind peer-reviewed journals that provides a forum to discuss South Asia’s position on global economic issues, its relations with other regional groupings and its response to global developments.

It is published twice a year by SAGE Publications in association with Institute of Policy Studies of Sri Lanka and Research and Information System for Developing Countries.

Sri Lankan economist Saman Kelegama co-edits the journal.

Abstracting and indexing 
South Asia Economic Journal is abstracted and indexed in:
 Australian Business Deans Council
 DeepDyve
 Dutch-KB
 EBSCO
 ICI
 J-Gate
 OCLC
 Ohio
 PAIS International – ProQuest
 Portico
 ProQuest-Illustrata
 Pro-Quest-RSP
 Research Papers in Economics (RePEc)
 SCOPUS
 EBSCO:EconLit

References

 http://www.ips.lk/
 http://www.ris.org.in/

External links
 
 Homepage

SAGE Publishing academic journals
Biannual journals
Economics journals
Publications established in 2001